Everybody's Girl is a 1918 American silent comedy drama film directed by Tom Terriss and written by A. Van Buren Powell. The film stars Alice Joyce, May Hopkins, and Walter McGrail.

Cast list

References

American silent feature films
American black-and-white films
1918 films
Films directed by Tom Terriss
1918 comedy-drama films
1910s English-language films
1910s American films
Silent American comedy-drama films